Traveller is the eighth studio album by Jørn Lande's solo project Jorn.

The album was released on June 14, 2013 in Europe and June 11, 2013 in North America. It is characterized by its heavy yet melodic sound. The album lyrics primarily center around the themes of life and death.

Former guitarist Tore Moren and bassist Nic Angileri left the band after the previous album, Bring Heavy Rock to the Land, to pursue solo careers. The new line-up for Traveller includes Wig Wam guitarist Trond Holter and bassist Bernt Jansen.

A video clip for the title track "Traveller" featuring the new members of JORN was released on May 28, 2013 and a follow-up video for "Cancer Demon" was released five weeks later 

Traveller is the only album featuring bassist Bernt Jansen and the last to feature guitarist Jimmy Iversen and Jorn longtime drummer and partner Willy Bendiksen, who left the band on November 4, 2013.

Track listing
 "Overload" – 5:21 (Jorn Lande)
 "Cancer Demon" – 4:28 (Lande)
 "Traveller" – 5:38 (Lande, Trond Holter)
 "Window Maker" – 4:26 (Lande, Espen Mjøen)
 "Make Your Engine Scream" – 4:12 (Lande, Holter)
 "Legend Man" – 4:01 (Lande, Mjøen)
 "Carry the Black" – 6:09 (Lande, Holter)
 "Rev On" – 4:43 (Lande, Holter)
 "Monsoon" – 4:20 (Lande, Jimmy Iversen)
 "The Man Who Was King" – 5:52 (Lande, Holter)
 "Arctic Night" (Instrumental) – 3:46 (Japan bonus track)

Personnel

Musicians
Jørn Lande – lead vocals
Trond Holter – guitars
Jimmy Iversen – guitars
Bernt Jansen – bass 
Willy Bendiksen – drums
 Espen Mjøen – bass 
 Tommy Hansen – keyboards

Production
Produced by Jørn Lande and Trond Holter
 Mixing and mastering by Tommy Hansen
 Artwork by Felipe Machado Franco

Release history

References 

2013 albums
Frontiers Records albums
Jørn Lande albums